Rennie's Mill may refer to several places:

 Tiu Keng Leng, or Rennie's Mill, an area of Hong Kong 
 Rennies Mill Road, in St. John's, Newfoundland and Labrador 
 Rennie's Mill Road Historic District, a National Historic Sites of Canada in Newfoundland and Labrador